Joensuu Airport  is an airport in Liperi, Finland, about  northwest of the city centre of Joensuu.

History
The airport was established in 1937.

Airlines and destinations

Statistics

Weather station
The Finnish Meteorological Institute has a weather station at the airport. The highest recorded natural temperature in Finland, was measured at the airport on 29 July 2010.

Ground transportation

Bus 
Route 6, operated by Joensuu Region Public Transport, operates between the airport and the city centre according to flight schedules.

See also 
List of the largest airports in the Nordic countries
Joensuu Railway Station

References

External links 

 Finavia – Joensuu Airport
 AIP Finland – Joensuu Airport
 
 

Airports in Finland
Buildings and structures in North Karelia
Airport
Liperi
International airports in Finland